Bakara is a village in Iraq.

Bakara may refer to the following.

Bakara, Nigeria, a populated place
Bakara, South Australia, a locality
Bakara Conservation Park, a protected area  in South Australia
Bakaara Market, a market in  Somalia
Hundred of Bakara, a cadastral unit in South Australia